Pow woW is a French musical group. Their biggest hit was "Le Chat" in 1992. Their next single was the French version of song "The Lion Sleeps Tonight", titled "Le lion est mort ce soir".

Members 
 Alain Chennevière
 Ahmed Mouici
 Pascal Periz
 Bertrand Pierre
 Yvo Abadi (drums)

Discography

Albums 
 Regagner les plaines (1992)
 Comme un guetteur (1993) - Mercury
 Pow woW (1995)
 Quatre (Best of) (1995) - Universal
 Chanter (2006) - WEA

Compilations 
 Master série (1998)

References

External links
 
 

French pop music groups